József Svidró is a Hungarian sprint canoer who competed in the 1970s. He won three medals at the ICF Canoe Sprint World Championships with a gold (K-1 4 x 500 m: 1975) and two bronzes (K-1 4 x 500 m: 1970, K-2 500 m: 1977).

References

Hungarian male canoeists
Living people
Year of birth missing (living people)
ICF Canoe Sprint World Championships medalists in kayak
20th-century Hungarian people